The George Nelson Fieldhouse is a multi-purpose arena on the campus of Utah State University in Logan, Utah. As a 6,500-seat arena, it was home to the Utah State University men's basketball team until the Dee Glen Smith Spectrum opened in 1970.  

Since the removal of the bleachers, the Fieldhouse now functions primarily as an exercise facility for Students. It contains two basketball courts, a running track, and a student fitness center. The building sits directly across from the Aggie Recreation Center, the largest exercise facility on campus.

Though the Fieldhouse no longer serves the USU basketball teams, it remains the primary venue for home varsity indoor track meets.

Outside of Athletics events and Campus Recreation, it is used as a venue especially for large festivals and parties, including Utah State's annual halloween party, The Howl, known for attracting large crowds.

External links
Venue information

Indoor arenas in Utah
Defunct college basketball venues in the United States
Basketball venues in Utah
Utah State Aggies basketball
Sports venues in Cache County, Utah
Sports venues completed in 1940
1940 establishments in Utah
College indoor track and field venues in the United States
Athletics (track and field) venues in Utah